Rory O'Tunny (fl. c. 1520 – 1542; , ; other spellings include Ruoricus, Otyuny, Otwyne, Otuyne, Otyyne) was an Irish sculptor.

Born into a family of sculptors, said to have originated in Callan, County Kilkenny, O'Tunney was primarily a sculptor of tombs. Among his more prominent works are three tombs in Kilcooly Abbey, the resting place of Sir John Grace and his wife, Honora Brenach, at Grace's Chapel, Tullaroan, Co. Kilkenny, and the tombs of Robert Walsh and his wife, Katherine Poer, at Jerpoint Abbey. He also carved the Trinity Stone once housed in St. Mary's Church, Callan.

References

RTÉ Report on the O'Tunny sculptures http://www.rte.ie/news/2010/0823/nationwide_av.html?2807072,null,228

Year of death missing
Irish sculptors
Year of birth uncertain
People from County Kilkenny
16th-century sculptors